Hilvan is a district of Şanlıurfa Province of Turkey, 55 km from the city of Şanlıurfa. It has an area of 1.278 km². And a population of (in the 2000 census) 38.411.

References 

Populated places in Şanlıurfa Province
Districts of Şanlıurfa Province
Kurdish settlements in Turkey